The women's 800 metres competition of the athletics events at the 2019 Pan American Games will take place between the 6 and 7 of August at the 2019 Pan American Games Athletics Stadium. The defending Pan American Games champion is Melissa Bishop from the Canada.

Summary
From the beginning of the final, Rose Mary Almanza asserted herself, hitting the break line first and pushing out to the front of the tight pack.  For most of the first lap, Sade Sealy sat immediately on Almanza's outer shoulder until the first pass down the home straight, when Natoya Goule moved forward into the outer position, briefly poking into the lead at the bell.  Almanza would not let Goule get far enough ahead to move in.  Sealy had to drop directly behind Almanza, with Déborah Rodríguez boxing her from the outside.  At the beginning of the final turn, Goule tried to accelerate around Almanza, but was held to the outside through the entire turn.  Coming off the turn, Almanza accelerated and gained a slight advantage, the two battling almost shoulder to shoulder down the home straight.  50 metres to go, Almanza's face began to show strain, Goule gained the advantage and went on for the win.  Fighting as she tied up, Almanza strained to hold off the fast closing Rodríguez, making one last jerk to get her torso over the finish line .02 ahead to retain silver

Records
Prior to this competition, the existing world and Pan American Games records were as follows:

Schedule

Results
All times shown are in seconds.

Semifinal
Qualification: First 3 in each heat (Q) and next 2 fastest (q) qualified for the final. The results were as follows:

Final
The results were as follows:

References

Athletics at the 2019 Pan American Games
2019